Minae Noji is an American actress. She is known for her roles as Karai in the 2014 Teenage Mutant Ninja Turtles film and Dr. Kelly Lee on General Hospital.

Life and career
Noji's father is an engineer and her mother is an accountant. She attended Mesa Robles Middle School and Glen A. Wilson High School in Hacienda Heights. She graduated from the University of California, Irvine with a bachelor's degree in sociology and music. She appeared on the soap opera General Hospital, playing the role of Dr. Kelly Lee from 2006 to 2012.

Filmography

Film

Television

Video games

References

External links
 

Living people
American actresses of Japanese descent
American film actresses
American film actors of Asian descent
American soap opera actresses
American television actresses
American video game actresses
American voice actresses
20th-century American actresses
21st-century American actresses
Year of birth missing (living people)